Caparde may refer to:
 Caparde, Osmaci, a village in Osmaci, Bosnia and Herzegovina
 Caparde (Lukavac), a village in Lukavac, Bosnia and Herzegovina